Unnikrishnan Manukrishnan (born 4 October 1988) is an Indian cricketer who plays for Kerala in domestic cricket. He is a bowling all-rounder who bats left-handed and bowls left-arm medium-pace.

Domestic career
Manukrishnan was born on 4 October 1988 in Manjummel, Kerala. He made his List A debut for Kerala on 16 February 2011 in the 2011-12 Vijay Hazare Trophy. He made his Twenty20 debut for Kerala on 16 October 2011 in the 2011-12 Syed Mushtaq Ali Trophy. He made his first-class debut for Kerala in the 2011–12 Ranji Trophy on 10 November 2011. 

He was the third highest wicket-taker for Kerala in the 2012-13 Ranji Trophy with 17 wickets from 4 matches including a fifer against Tripura. He was the third highest wicket taker for Kerala in the 2013-14 Syed Mushtaq Ali Trophy with 9 wickets. He bowled a career-best spell of 4 wickets off 6 runs, helping Kerala successfully defend a low score of 101 against Bengal. He was Kerala's second highest wicket taker in the 2014-15 Syed Mushtaq Ali Trophy with 7 wickets. and continued to be their second most wicket taking bowler in the 2015-16 Syed Mushtaq Ali Trophy with 10 wickets.

He was the top wicket-keeper of the 2020–21 KCA President's Cup T20, representing the title-winners, KCA Royals. Following this performance, he was named in the Kerala squad to play the 2021-22 Syed Mushtaq Ali Trophy, returning to the side after 5 years. He took 6 wickets from six matches with a best bowling figure of 3/26 against Tamil Nadu in the quarter-finals.

He is an employee of AG's office and has played club cricket tournaments representing it's cricket team.

References

External links
 

1988 births
Living people
Indian cricketers
Kerala cricketers